The George Perkins Marsh Prize is an annual book prize awarded by the American Society for Environmental History (ASEH). The prize, which was awarded bi-annually from its inception in 1989 until becoming an annual award in 2000, is awarded to what is adjudged to be the best book in environmental history. The award is named for the early American conservationist George Perkins Marsh.

Recipients

See also 

 List of history awards

References 

History awards
American non-fiction literary awards